Roller Coaster Weekend is the debut solo studio album by American rock musician Joe Vitale, released in 1974 by Atlantic Records. The album wasn't a commercial success and was his last solo album until 1981's Plantation Harbor (released seven years later). After the recording of Roller Coaster Weekend, Vitale would join the Stills-Young band and tour with Crosby, Stills, Nash & Young line-up, as well as the Eagles.

The song "Falling," was borrowed in part for Joe Walsh's song "At the Station", later recorded and released on Walsh's fourth solo album But Seriously, Folks... (1978)

Critical reception
In a retrospective review by AllMusic critic Rob Caldwell gave the album a star rating of 2 out of 5 (meaning "Poor") and he stated that considering the stalwart guitarists featured on the album it's a "song-oriented album" and he also added that the album "never quite gets off the ground."

Track listing

Personnel
Credits are adapted from the album's liner notes.

Musicians
 Joe Vitale – lead and background vocals; drums; bass guitar; keyboards; piano; synthesizers; vibraphone; flute; finger cymbals; gong; timpani; additional percussion
 Joe Walsh – guitar
 Phil Keaggy – guitar
 Rick Derringer – guitar
 Nelson "Flaco" Padron – congas; additional percussion
 "Howie" (Howard Albert) – handclaps
 "Ronnie" (Ron Albert) – handclaps
Production
 Howard Albert – Record producer; engineer
 Ron Albert – producer; engineer
 Joe Vitale – producer
 Alex Sadkin – audio mastering
 Arman Kachaturian – design; art direction

References

External links

Joe Vitale (musician) albums
1974 debut albums
Atlantic Records albums